The 1973 East Carolina Pirates football team was an American football team that represented East Carolina University as a member of the Southern Conference during the 1973 NCAA Division I football season. In their third season under head coach Sonny Randle, the team compiled a 9–2 record.

Frank Novak was the offensive coordinator in 1973

Carl Reese was the defensive coordinator in 1973

Schedule

References

East Carolina
East Carolina Pirates football seasons
Southern Conference football champion seasons
East Carolina Pirates football